Roztoky is a village and municipality in Svidník District in the Prešov Region of north-eastern Slovakia.

History
In historical records the village was first mentioned in 1435.

Geography
The municipality lies at an altitude of 374 metres and covers an area of 11.263 km². It has a population of about 281 people.

External links
 
 
 Roztoky - The Carpathian Connection
 https://web.archive.org/web/20071116010355/http://www.statistics.sk/mosmis/eng/run.html

Villages and municipalities in Svidník District
Šariš